Onychostoma gerlachi is a species of cyprinid in the genus Onychostoma. It inhabits inland wetlands in China, Laos, Thailand and Vietnam and is used for food locally. It is considered "near threatened" by the IUCN.

References

gerlachi
Cyprinid fish of Asia
Freshwater fish of China
Fish of Laos
Fish of Thailand
Fish of Vietnam
Fish described in 1881